is an omnimover ride themed after the Yoshi character and spin-off series in Super Nintendo World at Universal Studios Japan, with an upcoming version in Universal's Epic Universe.

Summary

Queue 
Guests enter the queue through a yellow Warp Pipe at the base of "Mount Beanpole," with signage resembling the spin-off series' logo. Guests then pass through hallways filled with objects from the series, such as Hint Blocks and Smiley Flowers, in an art-style based on Yoshi's New Island. The queue then leads to Toadette's house, which is built into a tree inside a forest, where she explains the ride. A wooden stairway then leads guests around the tree and up to the vehicle boarding area.

Ride 
The ride first transports attendees over a bridge, then into a Warp Pipe tunnel through a scene with two Yoshis carrying Baby Mario and Baby Peach away from Kamek and some Fly Guys, with Poochy nodding his head at passing vehicles at the pipe's exit. A viewport within the first pipe tunnel shows a view out into space with Starship Mario. Exiting the pipe, riders encounter several Baby Yoshis in desert and jungle areas, and finally pass Captain Toad's location at the end of the jungle.

Each ride vehicle has three Yoshi Egg shaped buttons on a dashboard, colored in blue, green, and red. If guests press the buttons in their vehicle as they pass the corresponding eggs during the attraction, they earn additional character stamps within the Universal Studios smartphone applications.

History 
The layout of Yoshi's Adventure was leaked across several years worth of leaked photographs, patents, and construction. The attraction was formally unveiled by Universal on November 30, 2020.

This ride, alongside the rest of Universal Studios Japan, was temporarily closed on April 25, 2021 amid rising concerns regarding the COVID-19 pandemic; the park reopened in June of the same year, maintaining enhanced health and safety protocols.

The attraction suffered two accidents during late 2021, with a Goomba stack animatronic falling onto the ride during operation on August 12, 2021, and a fire starting in one of the ride's indoor areas on November 23, 2021. This caused the ride to close again for two months, and re-opened again on January 16, 2022. Neither accidents led to any park guest injuries.

In January 2022, a clone of the attraction was announced for the upcoming Universal's Epic Universe, set to open in Summer 2025.

The presence of Yoshi's Adventure in Universal Studios Hollywood's version of Super Nintendo World had been speculated, but construction revealed that the attraction was not being built in Hollywood, due to the Lower Lot of the theme park having limited available space. It is currently unknown if the ride will be included in Universal Studios Singapore's version of Super Nintendo World.

Notes

References

External links 
 

Amusement rides based on video game franchises
Amusement rides introduced in 2021
Universal Studios Japan
Universal Orlando
2021 establishments in Japan
Yoshi
Amusement rides planned to open in 2025